Pauline Auzou (24 March 1775 – 15 May 1835) was a French painter and art instructor, who exhibited at the Paris Salon and was commissioned to make paintings of Napoleon and his wife Marie Louise, Duchess of Parma.

Personal life
Jeanne-Marie-Catherine Desmarquets (sometime written Desmarquest) was born in Paris on 24 March 1775. She assumed the surname La Chapelle when she was adopted by a cousin. In December 1793 she married the stationer Charles-Marie Auzou. Starting in 1794, they had at least two sons, two daughters and a child who did not survive infancy.

Jacques-Augustin-Catherine Pajou bought one house of theirs in Fontenay-aux-Roses in 1820.

She died in Paris on 15 May 1835.

Career
In the early late 18th century women were generally prevented from attaining an education in art academies in France, particularly if they did not have money and connections. Auzou attended Jean-Baptiste Regnault's atelier in 1802 along with Sophie Guillemard, Caroline Derigny and Henriette Lorimier. She was influenced by another woman artist, Marguerite Gérard, and by Jean-Auguste-Dominique Ingres.

Early in her studies and career, Auzou made paintings of legendary Greek figures. Very unusual for the time, when it was considered nearly underheard of for women to draw or paint nude people, Auzou made studies of nude women and men. Deemed inappropriate, women artists found greater success in creating paintings of women in homey settings, making music or reading.

She was a successful artist, first a Neoclassist, who made historic, genre and portrait paintings, including depictions of Napoleon. She received 2,000 to 4,000 francs in stipend payments, for the creation of essentially government mandated paintings of contemporary events, including paintings made of and for Napoleon. Troubadour art, was very much a style made by male artists, but there were several artists like Eugénie Servières, Hortense Haudebourt-Lescot, and  who added a feminine touch to makes of Caroline, Duchesse de Berry and Empress Josephine and others.

The Paris Salon opened up the exhibition to women's works in 1791. Her works were exhibited at the Paris Salon. In 1793, A Bacchante and A study of a head. She made a painting of legendary Daphnis and Phyllis, which was exhibited at the 1795 salon. In 1804, The First Sense of Coquetry was exhibited there. She was awarded a first class medal at the salon in 1806 for her painting of Pickard Elder, which in 1807 was represented in the painting Mr. Pickard and his family. In 1808, she was awarded the medaille de première classe for her work. That year she exhibited Mr. Picard and his family at the salon.

She made a painting of Napoleon and his bride shown at the 1810 salon entitled Archduchess Marie-Louise in Compiègne, depicts the newly married Napoleon who looks on fondly, and secondarily, as Marie-Louise is met by her ladys-in-waiting. Other paintings made of the couple by Auzou included a painting of Marie-Louise with her family, Her Majesty the Empress, before Her Marriage, at the Moment of Taking Leave of Her Family. Shown in 1806, Departure for the Duel depicts the family drama as a man looks at his sleeping wife and child before departing for a duel. Like other women artists of this time, Auzou depicted events as they impacted families. In this case, the wife was "condemned to seduction and the child to poverty," according to art critic Pierre-Jean-Baptiste Chaussard. She exhibited at the Paris Salon until 1817 and generally until 1820.

Auzou opened an art school for young women, like other women artists, Lizinka de Mirbel and Marie Guilhelmine Benoist, and men. The studio and school were maintained for 20 years. Her book Têtes d'études (English: Head studies) was published in Paris by Didot.

Her painting Portrait of a musician is in the collection of the Currier Museum of Art, Manchester, New Hampshire, United States. Two of her works of Empress Marie-Louise are in the collections of The National Museum of Versailles, Palace of Versailles, including Her Majesty the Empress, before Her Marriage, at the Moment of Taking Leave of Her Family. Her works were collected by the Society of Friends to the Arts, Duchess de Berri and the French government. Several of these works were engraved, as well as period genre paintings such as the work engraved by John Norman, Diana of France and Montmorency.

Legacy
Like Constance Mayer, Marguerite Gérard,  Antoinette Haudebourt-Lescot and Marie-Denise Villers, Auzou was one of the successful women artists following the French Revolution:

Works

 A Bacchante, exhibited at 1793 Paris Salon
 A study of a head, exhibited at 1793 Paris Salon
 Agnes de Meranie, 1808
 Arrival of Archduchess Marie-Louise in Compiègne (with new husband Napoleon), 1810
 Daphnis and Phyllis, exhibited at the 1795 salon
 Departure for the Duel, exhibited in 1806
 Diana of France and Montgomery, 1814
 Her Majesty the Empress, before Her Marriage, at the Moment of Taking Leave of Her Family, Versailles Gallery, 1812
 Louis-Benoît Picard and his family, 1807
 Archduchess Marie-Louise in Compiègne, exhibited at the 1810 salon
 Picard the Elder, 1806, won a medal of honor in 1806 and first prize at the 1808 Paris Salon
 Portrait of a girl, bust length, est. 1790s, Snite Museum of Art, University of Notre Dame
 Portrait of a musician, oil on canvas, 1809
 Portraits of Volney, 1795
 Regnault, 1800
 The First Sense of Coquetry, exhibited at the 1804 salon
 The Return of Charles X

References

External links

 Images of Pauline Auzou's work

1775 births
1835 deaths
Painters from Paris
French women painters
18th-century French painters
19th-century French painters
19th-century French women artists
18th-century French women artists